Events in chess in 1986.

Events
 Nigel Short won the Hoogovens Wijk aan Zee Chess Tournament 1986, held in January.
 28 July – 8 October.  World champion Garry Kasparov defended his title 12½ - 11½ against challenger Anatoly Karpov in the 1986 World Championship in London and Leningrad.

 Women's world champion Maia Chiburdanidze defended her title for the fourth time in the Women's World Chess Championship 1986, held in Sofia.

Births

 Gabriel Flom - 27 January
 Valeriy Aveskulov - 31 January
 Luca Shytaj - 3 February
 Andrei Murariu - 17 February
 Levan Pantsulaia - 26 February
 Alexandre Danin - 14 March
 Anuar Ismagambetov - 21 March
 Saptarshi Roy - 21 March
 Boris Grachev - 27 March
 Alexey Kim - 5 April
 Tatiana Kosintseva - 11 April
 Pavel Anisimov - 19 April
 Levon Babujian - 8 May
 Pentala Harikrishna - 10 May
 Vugar Gashimov - 24 July

Deaths
 Gedeon Barcza - 21 February
 Borislav Milić - 28 May
 Georgy Agzamov - 27 August

References

 
20th century in chess
Chess by year